The Cuban crocodile (Crocodylus rhombifer) is a small-medium species of crocodile endemic to Cuba. Despite its smaller size, it is a highly aggressive animal, and potentially dangerous to humans.

The Cuban crocodile is of interest to biologists, for its unique physical and behavioral traits. Long- and strong-legged, it is the most terrestrial of extant crocodiles. Its preferred habitat comprises freshwater environments such as marshes and rivers. There, the adults feed on fish, turtles and small mammals, while the young eat invertebrates and smaller fish. Mating occurs between May and July. Captive animals have displayed cooperative hunting behavior, and can be taught tricks, suggesting intelligence.

The Cuban crocodile is listed as Critically Endangered by the International Union for Conservation of Nature. Once spread across the Caribbean, its range has dwindled to including only the Zapata Swamp and Isla de la Juventud, due to hunting by humans. Captive breeding projects are in place to help the species recover.
The species fossil record reveals it had at one point a greater range, with fossil remains being found in The Bahamas, Hispaniola (in the Dominican Republic), and the Cayman Islands.

Taxonomy
The genus Crocodylus likely originated in Africa and radiated outwards towards Southeast Asia and the Americas, although an Australia/Asia origin has also been considered. Phylogenetic evidence supports Crocodylus diverging from its closest recent relative, the extinct Voay of Madagascar, around 25 million years ago, near the Oligocene/Miocene boundary.

Below is a cladogram based on a 2018 tip dating study by Lee & Yates simultaneously using morphological, molecular (DNA sequencing), and stratigraphic (fossil age) data, as revised by the 2021 Hekkala et al. paleogenomics study using DNA extracted from the extinct Voay.

Characteristics

The Cuban crocodile has numerous characteristics that set it apart from other crocodilians, such as its brighter adult colors, rougher, more 'pebbled' scales, and long, strong legs. 
This is a small to mid-sized crocodilian.

Distribution and habitat
Today, the Cuban crocodile can only be found in Cuba's Zapata Swamp and Isla de la Juventud, where it is highly endangered. It formerly ranged elsewhere in the Caribbean; fossils of this species have been found in the Cayman Islands, The Bahamas and Hispaniola (the Dominican Republic).

The Cuban crocodile appears to favor freshwater habitat such as swamps, marshes, and rivers and rarely swims in saltwater.

Biology and behavior
This species has been observed to display peculiar behavior not observed in other crocodilians. A colony of this species has exhibited what is strongly suspected to be pack-hunting behavior, which may explain the predation of prehistoric megafauna that coexisted with this species, such as giant Caribbean sloths and giant West Indian tortoises. The behavior has prompted much interest in the species, usually kept singly (especially so after such reports).
This species is also the most terrestrial of the crocodiles, with reduced webbing between digits on the hind feet and no webbing on the front feet. C. rhombifer exhibits highly intelligent behaviour unusual for crocodilians.

Hunting and diet
Small fish, arthropods, and crustaceans make up the diet of young Cuban crocodiles. Adults of the species feed mostly upon small mammals, fish, and turtles. They have blunt rear teeth, which aid in crushing the shells of their turtle prey. Cuban crocodiles also demonstrate the jumping feeding technique seen in other crocodilians, such as the American alligator. By thrusting with their powerful tails, they can leap from the water and snatch small animals from overhanging branches. The Cuban crocodile, while not a particularly large species, is often regarded as the most aggressive New World crocodile and is behaviorally dominant over the larger American crocodile in areas where the two species coexist. Data regarding attacks on humans are limited, but occurrences are likely rare given the species' very small distribution area and separation from human populations. Despite its reported aggression, there is only a single known fatal human attack by this species: an elderly man who was attacked and killed in 1995 while spearfishing in the Zapata Swamp.

Reproduction 
The mating season of the Cuban crocodile is between the months of May and July. This is thought to be related to environmental changes, such as rainfall and temperature. In the wild, crocodiles will nest in wet marshes; where they will create trenches and cover the eggs with organic material. In captivity, crocodiles will create mounds. During the nesting period, the Cuban crocodiles will lay between 30–40 eggs and the estimated incubation period is 58–70 days. Hatching can occur from late August to early September. Due to the predation of humans, raccoons, and other animals, many eggs will not hatch. At birth, hatchlings are approximately 2–3 inches in length, and are 1/4th of a pound in weight. As with other crocodilians the sex of the Cuban crocodile's offspring is determined by the temperature in the nest. In conservation, the eggs are kept in incubators that provide a constant environment of 32 degrees Celsius in order to produce males. Cuban crocodiles are an aggressive species and are known to have performed acts of cannibalism. This is a contributing cause for the majority of offspring not surviving to the juvenile stage. In 2012, two Cuban crocodile hatchlings were born in conservation at the National Zoo in Washington, D.C. This was the first time in 25 years that the Cuban crocodile had been successfully bred at this zoo.

Conservation 
The Cuban crocodile is a critically endangered species, listed on CITES appendix 1. Its restricted habitat and range make it very vulnerable. Humans have hunted this species to near extinction. Much research remains to be done on the remaining wild populations. The species is represented in captivity in Europe, the United States, and in at least one zoo in India, where breeding projects are taking place. Problems in the past with hybridisation have occurred, especially with the American crocodile, which limits the pure gene pool of this species.

Two famous Cuban crocodiles reside in the Skansen Aquarium in Sweden. The crocodiles, named Castro and Hillary, were previously owned by the Cuban leader Fidel Castro, before giving them away to the cosmonaut Vladimir Shatalov in 1978. When Shatalov could no longer take care of the crocodiles, they were given to the Moscow Zoo, which in turn gifted them to the Skansen aquarium in 1981. The crocodile couple has produced numerous children since 1984. One of the crocodiles was involved in an attack on a human in 2019 who held his arm over the enclosure during a crayfish party. The man survived but his arm was critically injured and had to be amputated.

References

External links

Crocodilian Online on the Cuban Crocodile 
Cuban Crocodile Fact Sheet

Crocodylidae
Endemic fauna of Cuba
Reptiles of Cuba
Reptiles of the Caribbean
Reptiles described in 1807
Taxa named by Georges Cuvier
Crocodilians of North America
Extant Pleistocene first appearances
Apex predators